Kirsha is a unisex given name. Notable people with the name include:

Kirsha Danilov, 19th century Russian folklorist 
Kirsha Kaechele (born 1976), American contemporary art curator and artist

See also
Kirsha Training Centre in Donetsk, Ukraine

Unisex given names